Francesca Martiradonna (born 21 June 1973 in Trieste) is a retired Italian basketball player.

References

1973 births
Living people
Italian women's basketball players
Sportspeople from Trieste
20th-century Italian women